The Rural Municipality of Walpole No. 92 is a rural municipality (RM) in the Canadian province of Saskatchewan within Census Division No. 1 and  Division No. 1.

History 
The RM of Pipestone No. 92 was originally incorporated as a rural municipality on December 12, 1910. Its name was changed to the RM of Walpole No. 92 on February 15, 1911.

Geography

Communities and localities 
The following unincorporated communities are within the RM.

Localities
Mair
Kelso
Parkman
Riga
Walpole

Demographics 

Government 
The RM of Walpole No. 92 is governed by an elected municipal council and an appointed administrator that meets on the second Wednesday of every month. The reeve of the RM is Hugh Smyth while its administrator is Deborah C. Saville. The RM's office is located in Wawota.

Transportation 
Rail
Reston Section C.P.R. -- serves Reston, Ewart, Ebor, Maryfield, Fairlight, Walpole, Wawota, Dumas

Roads
Highway 48—serves Wawota, Saskatchewan
Highway 8 --
Highway 601 --

See also 
List of rural municipalities in Saskatchewan

References 

Walpole
Division No. 1, Saskatchewan